Peter John Randles (10 June 1923 – 12 April 2008), Australian politician, was a member of the Victorian Legislative Assembly for the Electoral district of Brunswick, representing the Labor Party, from 1949–1955. Following the Labor Party split in 1955, he joined the Australian Labor Party (Anti-Communist) (later the Democratic Labor Party).  At the state election a month later, his seat was abolished. He unsuccessfully contested the new electorate of Brunswick West.

References

1923 births
2008 deaths
Australian Labor Party members of the Parliament of Victoria
Democratic Labor Party (historical) members of the Parliament of Victoria
Victoria (Australia) state politicians
Place of death missing
Members of the Victorian Legislative Assembly
20th-century Australian politicians